Sandwarriors is a 1997 video game developed by Astros Productions and published by Interplay Entertainment. The game is a combat/flight sim.

Reception

PC Zone gave the game a score of 7.4 out of 10 stating "It's not a bad game by any means; it simply just doesn't distinguish itself from the pack. As Ron Pickering used to say to the losing team on the programme We Are The Champions, that's just 'hard lines"

References

1997 video games